Krasnopresnenskaya is a Moscow Metro station in the Presnensky District, Central Administrative Okrug, Moscow. It is on the Koltsevaya line, between Kiyevskaya and Belorusskaya stations. It was named for the street, Krasnaya Presnya, on which it is situated. Passengers may transfer to Barrikadnaya station on the Tagansko–Krasnopresnenskaya line.

Design and Layout

It was designed by Victor Yegerev, M. Konstantinov, Felix Novikov, and I. Pokrovsky and opened on 14 March 1954. The station has red granite pylons with white marble cornices and 14 bas-reliefs by N. Shcherbakov, Yu. Pommer, Yu. Ushakov, V. Fedorov, and G. Kolesnikov.  As the Presnya area of Moscow was the site of the Moscow Uprising of 1905 during the 1905 Russian Revolution, the station is decorated with artwork commemorating the events of the period. Eight of the bas-reliefs depict the events of the Russian Revolution of 1905 and the other six show scenes from the Russian Revolution of 1917. Statues of Vladimir Lenin and Joseph Stalin originally stood at the end of the platform, though these had been removed by the early 1960s. Later, the passage to Barrikadnaya was built in the same location.

The station's round vestibule is on the south side of Krasnaya Presnya street, between Druzhinnikovskaya and Konyushkovskaya streets. A sculpture by A. Zelinsky entitled "Combatant" is located in front.

References

External links 

 Коды станций московского метро
 Московское метро — проект Студии Артемия Лебедева

Moscow Metro stations
Railway stations in Russia opened in 1954
Koltsevaya Line
Railway stations located underground in Russia